David Nainkin (born 20 September 1970) is a former professional tennis player from South Africa.

Career
Nainkin never reached a final on the ATP Tour but made it into the semi finals of the 1995 Nokia Open in Beijing, before losing to Michael Chang.

He had the best win of his Grand Slam career at the 1996 US Open when he upset countryman and number nine seed Wayne Ferreira 6–4, 6–4, 2–6, 7–5 in the opening round. This was despite Nainkin being ranked 215 in the world and having never previously won a Gram Slam match in five attempts. He lost in straight sets to Jonas Björkman in the second round. In the 1998 US Open he made it into the third round, his best ever showing, with wins over fellow qualifier Mark Merklein (6–7, 6–0, 6–4, 6–4 ) and French Open winner Gustavo Kuerten (2–6, 6–4, 6–3, 6–4). He was then eliminated by eventual champion Patrick Rafter 6–1, 6–1, 6–1.

The South African represented his country at the 1998 and 1999 Davis Cups.

He now works for the United States Tennis Association and coaches top American players such as Mardy Fish, Sam Querrey and Sloane Stephens. Previously, he had been the personal coach of Wayne Ferreira.

In 2020 he was the head coach for the US Olympic Tennis Team.

Challenger titles

Singles: (1)

Doubles: (4)

References

1970 births
Living people
South African male tennis players
South African tennis coaches
South African expatriates in the United States